The long tailpipe is an argument stating that usage of electric vehicles does not always result in fewer emissions (e.g. greenhouse gas emissions) compared to those from non-electric vehicles. While the argument acknowledges that plug-in electric vehicles operating in all-electric mode have no greenhouse gas emissions from the onboard source of power, it claims that these emissions are shifted from the vehicle tailpipe to the location of the electrical generation plants. From the point of view of a well-to-wheel assessment, the extent of the actual carbon footprint depends on the fuel and technology used for electricity generation, as well as the impact of additional electricity demand on the phase-out of fossil fuel power plants.

Description

Plug-in electric vehicles (PEVs) operating in all-electric mode do not emit greenhouse gases from the onboard source of power but emissions are shifted to the location of the generation plants. From the point of view of a well-to-wheel assessment, the extent of the actual carbon footprint depends on the fuel and technology used for electricity generation. From the perspective of a full life cycle analysis, the electricity used to recharge the batteries must be generated from renewable or clean sources such as wind, solar, hydroelectric, or nuclear power for PEVs to have almost none or zero well-to-wheel emissions. On the other hand, when PEVs are recharged from coal-fired plants, they usually produce slightly more greenhouse gas emissions than internal combustion engine vehicles and higher than hybrid electric vehicles.

Because plug-in electric vehicles do not produce emissions at the point of operation are often perceived as being environmentally friendlier than vehicles driven through internal combustion. Assessing the validity of that perception is difficult due to the greenhouse gases generated by the power plants that provide the electricity to charge the vehicles' batteries. The U.S. Department of Energy published a concise description of the problem: "Electric vehicles (EVs) themselves emit no greenhouse gases (GHGs), but substantial emissions can be produced 'upstream' at the electric power plant."

A recent study by the German IfW shows that the increased electricity demand, and the resulting delay in the shutdown of coal-fired power plants in Germany, causes electric vehicles to have 73% higher  emissions than Diesel vehicles.

Carbon footprint in selected countries
A study published in the UK in April 2013 assessed the carbon footprint of plug-in electric vehicles in 20 countries. As a baseline the analysis established that manufacturing emissions account for 70 g CO2/km. The study found that in countries with coal-intensive generation, PEVs are no different from conventional petrol-powered vehicles. Among these countries are China, Indonesia, Australia, South Africa and India. A pure electric car in India generates emissions comparable to a  petrol car. The country ranking was led by Paraguay, where all electricity is produced from hydropower, and Iceland, where electricity production relies on renewable power, mainly hydro and geothermal power. Resulting carbon emissions from an electric car in both countries are 70 g CO2/km, which is equivalent to a  petrol car, and correspond to manufacturing emissions. Next in the ranking are other countries with similar low carbon electricity generation, including Sweden (mostly hydro and nuclear power ), Brazil (mainly hydropower) and France (predominantly nuclear power). Countries ranking in the middle include Japan, Germany, the UK and the United States.

The following table shows the emission intensity estimated in the study for each of the 20 countries, and the corresponding emissions equivalent in miles per US gallon of a petrol-powered car:

Carbon footprint in the United States
In the case of the United States, the Union of Concerned Scientists (UCS) conducted a study in 2012 to assess average greenhouse gas emissions resulting from charging plug-in car batteries from the perspective of the full life-cycle (well-to-wheel analysis) and according to fuel and technology used to generate electric power by region. The study used the Nissan Leaf all-electric car to establish the analysis baseline, and electric-utility emissions are based on EPA's 2007 estimates. The UCS study expressed the results in terms of miles per gallon instead of the conventional unit of grams of greenhouse gases or carbon dioxide equivalent emissions per year in order to make the results more friendly for consumers. The study found that in areas where electricity is generated from natural gas, nuclear, hydroelectric or renewable sources, the potential of plug-in electric cars to reduce greenhouse emissions is significant. On the other hand, in regions where a high proportion of power is generated from coal, hybrid electric cars produce less CO2 equivalent emissions than plug-in electric cars, and the best fuel efficient gasoline-powered subcompact car produces slightly less emissions than a PEV. In contrast, in a region that is completely reliant on natural gas, the PEV would be equivalent to a gasoline-powered car rated at.

The following table shows a representative sample of cities within each of the three categories of emissions intensity used in the UCS study, showing the corresponding miles per gallon equivalent for each city as compared to the greenhouse gas emissions of a gasoline-powered car:

An analysis of EPA power plant data from 2016 showed improvement in mpg-equivalent ratings of electric cars for nearly all regions, with a national weighted average of 80 mpg for electric vehicles. The regions with the highest ratings include upstate New York, New England, and California at over 100 mpg, while only Oahu, Wisconsin, and part of Illinois and Missouri are below 40 mpg, though still higher than nearly all gasoline cars.

Criticism
The long tailpipe has been the target of criticism, ranging from claims that many estimates are methodologically flawed to estimates that state that electricity generation in the United States will become less carbon-intensive over time. Tesla Motors CEO Elon Musk published his own criticism of the long tailpipe.
The extraction and refining of carbon based fuels and its distribution is in itself an energy intensive industry contributing to CO2 emissions. In 2007 U.S. refineries consumed 39353 million kWh, 70769 million lbs of steam and 697593 million cubic feet of Natural Gas. And the refining energy efficiency for gasoline is estimated to be, at best, 87.7%.

References

External links
 Greenhouse Gas Emissions for Electric and Plug-In Hybrid Electric Vehicles, web tool to estimate GHG by car model and zip code, U.S. Department of Energy and U.S. Environmental Protection Agency.
 Shades of Green - Electric Car's Carbon Emissions Around the Globe, Shrink that Footprint, February 2013.
 State of Charge: Electric Vehicles' Global Warming Emissions and Fuel-Cost Savings across the United States, Union of Concerned Scientists, April 2012.

Electric power generation
Greenhouse gas emissions
Electric vehicles